Entrañas is the second mixtape by Venezuelan electronic music producer Arca. It was released for free download on 4 July 2016 through Arca's SoundCloud page and Mediafire. It features contributions from Total Freedom, Massacooraman and Mica Levi, who is also known as Micachu. Even though 14 tracks are listed, the entire mixtape is in sequence as a single track.

The music video for the track, "Sin Rumbo", debuted one day prior to mixtape's release.

Critical reception

Upon release, Entrañas received universal acclaim from music critics. Consequence critic David Sackllah described the record as "purely visceral, constantly obliterating conventions" and thought "the underlying frenetic nature of Entrañas makes it all the more unsettling when the mix reaches its final track, the four-minute 'Sin Rumbo'." Philip Sherburne of Pitchfork, who considered the mixtape as "heavier and more unrelenting" than Arca's previous release, Mutant (2015), described it as a "quintessential Arca recording, commingling pleasure and terror and beauty and ugliness in the most thrilling ways possible."

Accolades

Track listing

Sample credits
 "Cement Garden Interlude" contains a sample of Charlotte Gainsbourg's speech from the 1993 film The Cement Garden.
 "Baby Doll" contains a sample of "Beatrix", written and performed by the Cocteau Twins from their 1984 album, Treasure.
 "Think Of" contains a sample of "Boyfriend", performed by Ashlee Simpson from her 2005 album I Am Me.

Personnel
 Arca – performance, production
 Mica Levi – performance (tracks 6, 8)
 Massacooraman – performance (track 8)
 Total Freedom – performance (track 11)
 Jesse Kanda – artwork

References

External links
 

2016 mixtape albums
Arca (musician) albums
Albums produced by Arca (musician)
Self-released albums
Albums free for download by copyright owner
Spanish-language albums